Milea (also Milia) is a village and a community of the Grevena municipality. Before the 2011 local government reform it was a part of the municipality of Irakleotes, of which it was a municipal district. The 2011 census recorded 205 residents in the village. The community of Milea covers an area of 10.077 km2.

History 
The village's original position has changed in the early '70s, when it was completely abandoned due to soil instability. The aforementioned village is now called Palia Milea (which means Old Milea) and it maintains its original architecture where stone is the prevailing material.

Natural History Museum

In 1997 an inhabitant called Athanasios Delivos discovered the first pair of tusks by chance, after a heavy rainfall. Their length is 4,39m. Dr. Evaggelia Tsoukala with her colleagues from Aristotle University of Thessaloniki was responsible for the excavations. During the excavations which also continued in the sequential years, a partial skeleton of the mastodont "Mammut" borsoni (Hays, 1834) (Proboscidea) was discovered. The skeleton includes substantial portions of the skull — maxillary area — with left and right molar series, with the longest upper tusks ever found in Greece (4.39 m), the most complete mandible with left and right molar series (M2 + M3) and two lower incisor tusks, as well as post-cranial skeleton. It represents a very large adult of about 40 years in age.

In 2007, Dr. Tsoukala and her team discovered new, longer tusks along with other findings. Their length is 5,02m and they have been awarded the World's Guinness Records Award. The mastodont's age is evaluated at 3.000.000 years. Various other parts of mastodonts and other pre-historic animals were found there. All those findings can be seen at the Natural History Museum of Milia. It already counts more than 15.000 visitors from all over the world.

References

Populated places in Grevena (regional unit)